The Bihar Pradesh Congress Committee (BPCC) is the political unit of the Indian National Congress for the  state of Bihar. Its head office is situated in Patna at the Sadaqat Ashram. 

The current working presidents are Shyam Sunder Singh Dheeraj, Ashok Kumar, Sameer Kumar Singh, and Qaukab Kadri.

Organisation
The BPCC comprises several committees, including a screening committee for potential election candidates and, since July 2011, a committee co-ordinate interactions between the state organisation and that at national level. There is also a monitoring committee, established around December 2010 to monitor the various Central Government schemes in Bihar. The former MLC Vijay Shankar Mishra is the Chairman of the recently reshuffled committee.

In addition, the BPCC has constituent organisations, including:

Bihar Pradesh Congress Committee Minority Department is the Bihar Chapter of Congress Minority Wing And Minnat Rahmani is State Chairman since 2014.
Bihar Pradesh Congress Seva Dal is the Bihar chapter of the Congress
Bihar Youth Congress is the Bihar chapter of the Indian Youth Congress
NSUI Bihar is the Bihar chapter of the National Students Union of India
INTUC Bihar is the Bihar chapter of the Indian National Trade Union Congress

Bihar Legislative Assembly election

BPCC presidents

List of chief ministers of Bihar from the Congress Party

List of deputy chief ministers of Bihar from the Congress Party

List of union ministers from BPCC
 Lalit Narayan Mishra
 Jagjivan Ram
 Ram Dulari Sinha
 B. P. Mandal
 Abdul Ghafoor (politician)
 Ram Lakhan Singh Yadav
 Jagannath Mishra
 Baleshwar Ram
 Bindeshwari Dubey
 Chandrashekhar Singh
 Ram Subhag Singh
 Bali Ram Bhagat
 Meira Kumar

Performance in state elections

References

External links
 INC website

Politics of Bihar
Indian National Congress by state or union territory